Goodchild is an English regional surname originating in East Anglia and may refer to:

Chloe Goodchild, British musician
David Goodchild (born 1976), English cricketer
Doreen Goodchild (1900–1998), South Australian artist
Gary Goodchild (born 1958), English footballer
George Goodchild (1888–1969), British writer
Jim Goodchild (1892–1950), English footballer
John Goodchild (1851–1914), British physician, poet and mystic, author of Light of the West
John C. Goodchild (1898–1980), South Australian artist
Johnny Goodchild (born 1939), English footballer
Michael F. Goodchild (born 1944), British-American geographer
Peter Goodchild (born 1939), BBC television producer and editor
Richard Goodchild (1918-1968), British provincial Roman archeologist
Ronald Goodchild (1910–1998), Anglican bishop of Kensington
Tim Goodchild, British set designer
William Goodchild (born 1964), British musician and composer
In fiction
Trevor Goodchild, fictional character in the MTV cartoon Æon Flux